Scaife is a surname meaning "Boat born" in  English. It is derived from Old Norse. Other references include "awry, difficult". The first recorded instance of this surname was in the Old English epic Beowulf. Notable people with the surname include:

Adam Scaife (born 1970), British physicist and meteorologist
Anna Scaife (born 1981), professor of radio astronomy
Brendan Scaife (born 1928), Irish Academic Engineer and Physicist
Bo Scaife (born 1981), American professional football player
Bobby Scaife (born 1955), English professional football player
Cordelia Scaife May (1928–2005), American wealthy philanthropist; sister of Richard Mellon Scaife
Prof J. G. Scaife (1934–1991) British molecular biologist
John Scaife (1908–1995) Australian cricketer
Michael Scaife (1948–2001), British biologist and psychologist
Nicola Scaife, Australian balloonist
Nicky Scaife (born 1975), English professional footballer
Richard Mellon Scaife (1932–2014), American newspaper publisher; heir to the Mellon fortune
Ross Scaife (1960–2008), American academic and scholar

Other uses:
Scaife Foundations
Scaife Mountains

See also
Scaif
Skaife

References

English-language surnames